The þættir (Old Norse singular þáttr, literally meaning a "strand" of rope or yarn) are short stories written mostly in Iceland during the 13th and 14th centuries.

The majority of þættir occur in two compendious manuscripts, Morkinskinna and Flateyjarbók, and within them most are found as digressions within kings' sagas. Sverrir Tómasson regards those in Morkinskinna, at least, as exempla or illustrations inseparable from the narratives that contain them, filling out the picture of the kings' qualities, good and bad, as well as adding comic relief.

Íslendinga þættir
The short tales of Icelanders or Íslendinga þættir focus on Icelanders, often relating the story of their travels abroad to the court of a Norwegian king.

List of short tales:

 Albani þáttr ok Sunnifu
 Arnórs þáttr jarlaskálds
 Auðunar þáttr vestfirzka
 Bergbúa þáttr
 Bolla þáttr Bollasonar
 Brandkrossa þáttr
 Brands þáttr örva
 Draumr Þorsteins Síðu-Hallssonar
 Egils þáttr Síðu-Hallssonar
 Einars þáttr Skúlasonar
 Eiríks þáttr rauða
 Geirmundar þáttr
 Gísls þáttr Illugasonar
 Grœnlendinga þáttr (I)
 Grœnlendinga þáttr (II)/Einars þáttr Sokkasonar
 Gull-Ásu-Þórðar þáttr
 Gunnars þáttr Þiðrandabana
 Halldórs þáttr Snorrasonar inn fyrri
 Halldórs þáttr Snorrasonar inn síðari
 Hallfreðar þáttr vandræðaskálds
 Hauks þáttr hábrókar
 Hrafns þáttr Guðrúnarsonar
 Hreiðars þáttr
 Hrómundar þáttr halta
 Íslendings þáttr sögufróða
 Ívars þáttr Ingimundarsonar
 Jökuls þáttr Búasonar
 Kjartans þáttr Ólafssonar
 Kristni þáttr
 Kumlbúa þáttr
 Mána þáttr skálds
 Odds þáttr Ófeigssonar
 Orms þáttr Stórólfssonar
 Óttars þáttr svarta
 Rauðs þáttr hins ramma
 Rauðúlfs þáttr
 Rögnvalds þáttr ok Rauðs
 Sneglu-Halla þáttr
 Steins þáttr Skaptasonar
 Stefnis þáttr Þorgilssonar
 Stjörnu-Odda draumr
 Stúfs þáttr inn meiri
 Stúfs þáttr inn skemmri
 Svaða þáttr ok Arnórs kerlingarnefs
 Sveins þáttr ok Finns
 Þiðranda þáttr ok Þórhalls
 Þorgríms þáttr Hallasonar
 Þorleifs þáttr jarlaskálds
 Þormóðar þáttr
 Þorsteins þáttr Austfirðings
 Þorsteins þáttr forvitna
 Þorsteins þáttr Síðu-Hallssonar
 Þorsteins þáttr skelks
 Þorsteins þáttr stangarhöggs
 Þorsteins þáttr sögufróða
 Þorsteins þáttr tjaldstœðings
 Þorsteins þáttr uxafóts
 Þorvalds þáttr tasalda
 Þorvalds þáttr víðförla
 Þorvarðar þáttr krákunefs
 Þórarins þáttr Nefjólfssonar
 Þórarins þáttr ofsa
 Þórarins þáttr stuttfeldar
 Þórhalls þáttr knapps
 Ævi Snorra goða
 Ögmundar þáttr dytts (also known as Gunnars þáttr helmings)
 Ölkofra þáttr

Legendary þættir
 Ásbjarnar þáttr Selsbana
 Helga þáttr ok Úlfs
 Helga þáttr Þórissonar
 Norna-Gests þáttr
 Ragnarssona þáttr
 Sörla þáttr
 Tóka þáttr Tókasonar
 Völsa þáttr
 Þorsteins þáttr bæjarmagns

Other þættir
 Brenna Adams byskups
 Eindriða þáttr ok Erlings
 Eymundar þáttr hrings
 Eymundar þáttr af Skörum
 Hálfdanar þáttr svarta
 Haralds þáttr grenska
 Haralds þáttr hárfagra
 Hemings þáttr Áslákssonar (two versions)
 Hróa þáttr heimska
 Ísleifs þáttr byskups
 Knúts þáttr hins ríka
 Orkneyinga þáttr
 Otto þáttr keisara
 Ólafs þáttr Geirstaðaálfs
 Styrbjarnar þáttr Svíakappa

Notes

Translations
 (Tale of Halfdan the Black, 1-11; Tale of Hauk High-Breeches, pp. 11–20; Tale of Jokul Buason, pp. 53–64; Tale of Brindle-Cross, pp. 65–72)

References
Ármann Jakobsson (2013). 'The life and death of the medieval Icelandic short story'. JEGP, Journal of English and Germanic Philology. 112. pp. 257–291
 Ashman Rowe, Elizabeth & Harris, Joseph (2007). 'Short Prose Narrative (þáttr)', in Rory McTurk (ed.) A Companion to Old Norse-Icelandic Literature and Culture. Oxford: Blackwell Publishing, pp. 462–478

 O'Donoghue, Heather (2004). Old Norse-Icelandic Literature: A Short Introduction. Blackwell Publishing. 
 Sverrir Tómasson (2006). "Old Icelandic Prose," tr. Gunnþórunn Guðmundsdóttir, in Daisy Neijmann, ed. A History of Icelandic Literature. Lincoln: University of Nebraska. 

 
Old Norse literature
Short stories